Broad Run is a tributary stream of the Potomac River in Montgomery County, Maryland. The Broad Run and its watershed are almost entirely within the Montgomery County Agricultural Reserve.

Tributaries of Broad Run
 Wasche Road Tributary
 Big John Run

See also
Broad Run (Loudoun County, Virginia)
List of Maryland rivers

References

 MCDEP. "The Broad Run, Horsepen Branch, and Western County Potomac Drainages." Accessed 2010-04-27.

Rivers of Montgomery County, Maryland
Rivers of Maryland
Tributaries of the Potomac River